The Cato River is a river in Ñuble Region in the southern portion of Central Chile. It joins the Ñuble River about 1 km to the east of Chile Route 5. Close to its mouth is the city of Chillán.

See also
List of rivers of Chile

Rivers of Chile
Rivers of Ñuble Region